The 1997 Rexona Cup was a women's tennis tournament played on outdoor clay courts at the Am Rothenbaum in Hamburg in Germany that was part of Tier II of the 1997 WTA Tour. The tournament was held from 28 April through 4 May 1997. Iva Majoli won the singles title.

Finals

Singles

 Iva Majoli defeated  Ruxandra Dragomir 6–3, 6–2
 It was Majoli's 2nd title of the year and the 6th of her career.

Doubles

 Anke Huber /  Mary Pierce defeated  Ruxandra Dragomir /  Iva Majoli 2–6, 7–6, 6–2
 It was Huber's only title of the year and the 11th of her career. It was Pierce's 1st title of the year and the 10th of her career.

External links
 ITF tournament edition details
 Tournament draws

Rexona Cup
WTA Hamburg
1997 in German women's sport
1997 in German tennis